The Urias Hardy House is a historic house at 50 Brown Street in Methuen, Massachusetts.

Description and history 
Urias Hardy was an overseer at the nearby Arlington Mills. The Brown Street house, built in 1900, is a fine example of the large single-family home constructed during a time of rapid middle class expansion. The larger more elaborate home is in contrast to the smaller worker houses being built closer to the mills. The Hardy House was built during a period when Methuen became a "bedroom" community for the more urban Lawrence, and is associated with the last period of single-family house building prior to World War II.

It was added to the National Register of Historic Places on January 20, 1984.

See also
 National Register of Historic Places listings in Methuen, Massachusetts
 National Register of Historic Places listings in Essex County, Massachusetts

References

Houses in Methuen, Massachusetts
Houses completed in 1900
National Register of Historic Places in Methuen, Massachusetts
Houses on the National Register of Historic Places in Essex County, Massachusetts
Shingle Style houses
Shingle Style architecture in Massachusetts